Vijeta (English: The Victor) is a 1982 Indian coming-of-age Hindi film produced by Shashi Kapoor and directed by Govind Nihalani. It stars Shashi Kapoor, his son Kunal Kapoor, Rekha, Amrish Puri and Supriya Pathak with K.K. Raina, Raja Bundela and Shafi Inamdar, who went on to become notable supporting actors in Bollywood movies.

Plot
Angad (Kunal Kapoor) is a confused teenager trying to find himself and is caught in between the marital problems of his Maharashtrian mother Neelima (Rekha) and Punjabi father Nihal (Shashi Kapoor), it is time for him to decide what he wants to do with his life. Angad chooses to become a fighter pilot with the Indian Air Force. What follows is his struggle to become a victor both with his self and the outer world. Angad is attracted to Anna Varghese (Supriya Pathak), who is the daughter of his flying instructor Group Captain Varghese (Amrish Puri) a Malayali Syrian Christian. Angad must learn to adapt to flying, leaving his mom and dad for long periods of time, as well as try and woo Anna who helps him overcome his fears and realize his potential as a fighter pilot. Nihal is a clean-shaven Sikh, Neelima is a Hindu, Angad is a Sikh and Anna a Christian, while Angad's fellow officers represent all religions.

The film is notable for some rarely seen aerial photography of combat aircraft active with the IAF in the 1980s. The central character of Angad is a MiG-21 pilot and is shown flying the aircraft in the ground attack role in the Indo-Pakistani War of 1971. Much of the movie, including the climax involving a MiG-21bis, was shot at Pune. The IAF No.4 Squadron (the 'Oorials') provided the pilots and planes for the film's aerial sequences. The movie included good color footage of the Oorials aircraft in flight and in operation.

Cast
Shashi Kapoor as Nihal Singh
Rekha as Neelima Singh
Supriya Pathak as Anna Varghese
Kunal Kapoor as Angad
Madan Jain as Venkat Raju
Raja Bundela as Aslam Khan
K.K. Raina as Wilson
Amrish Puri as Group Captain Varghese, the Chief Instructor
Om Puri as Arvind
Dina Pathak as Angad's grandmother 
Shafi Inamdar as Wing Commander Parulkar
Sulabha Deshpande
Capt Anup Ghosh as Squadron Leader

Music
Vasant Dev wrote all the songs.

"Bichhurat Mose Kanha" - Parveen Sultana
"Man Aanand Aanand Chhaayo" - Asha Bhosle, Satyasheel Deshpande
"Man Base Mor Brindaban Ma" - Manna Dey

Facts

 The "senior pilots of the Indian Air Force" who are credited with providing assistance with the aerial photography were drawn from No. 4 Squadron, IAF ("The Fighting Oorials"). It was their MIG-21Bis' that were used in the aerial combat sequences and much of the film was shot at their then base in Poona/Pune.
 The I.N.S. Mysore seen in the film was a WW2 British Fiji Class Cruiser, H.M.S. Nigeria that was sold to the Indian Navy in 1957. The ship was decommissioned soon after the film was completed. The current (2006) I.N.S. Mysore is a newer vessel.
 The aircraft that the pilots train on are domestically produced HAL HJT-16 Kirans.

Filming locations

 Air Force Academy, Dundigal, Hyderabad, Andhra Pradesh, India
 Air Force Station, Pune, Maharashtra, India
 National Defence Academy, Khadakswala, Pune, Maharashtra, India
 R.K. Studios, Chembur, Mumbai, Maharashtra, India

Reception
Film World magazine rated the film "Good" and wrote, "Vijeta is perhaps the first film of its kind, a film which shows the Indian Air Force, its gallant men and their life in true colours." According to Asiaweek, "Vijeta is a tribute to the IAF in celebration of its golden jubilee last year".

Awards

 31st Filmfare Awards:

Won

 Best Cinematography – Govind Nihalani
 Best Sound Design – Hitendra Ghosh
 Best Editing – Keshav Naidu

See also
Tactics and Air Combat and Defence Establishment
College of Air Warfare
Topgun

References

External links

1983 films
Indian aviation films
1980s Hindi-language films
Indian war films
Indian coming-of-age films
Films scored by Ajit Varman
Films directed by Govind Nihalani
Indian Army in films
Indian Air Force in films
Films based on Indo-Pakistani wars and conflicts
Military of Pakistan in films
1980s coming-of-age films
1980s war films